A pooling equilibrium in game theory is an equilibria result of a signaling game.   

In a signaling game, players send actions called "signals" to other players in the game. Signaling actions are chosen based on privately held information (not known by other players in the game).  These actions do not reveal a player's "type" to other players in the game, and other players will choose strategies accordingly.  Under this equilibria, all types of a given sender will send the same signal, some representing their true type, some correctly mimicking the type of others, as they have no incentive to differentiate themselves. The receiver therefore acts like having received no information/message maximizing his/her utility according to his/her prior belief.

See also 
Separating equilibrium

Game theory equilibrium concepts
Asymmetric information